Public intelligence may refer to:

Collective intelligence
Common knowledge
Public Intelligence (a special application of Open-source Intelligence)